Ferdjioua is a city in Algeria, formerly called Fedj M'zala, town and commune in Mila Province, Algeria. At the 2008 census it had a population of 61,894.

References

Communes of Mila Province